{{redirect|Cube 2|the video game|Cube 2: SauerbratenCube 2: Sauerbraten|the digital audio player|Cube2}}Cube 2: Hypercube (stylized on-screen as Cube²: Hypercube) is a 2002 Canadian science fiction horror film directed by Andrzej Sekuła, written by Sean Hood, and produced by Ernie Barbarash, Peter Block, and Suzanne Colvin. It is the second film in the Cube film series and a sequel to Cube.

Released in 2002, Hypercube replaces the colored industrial-style rooms of the first film with high-tech, brightly lit chambers. Instead of industrial traps such as flamethrowers and extending spikes, the rooms have "evolved" to control illusions, time, space, and reality.

The film's critical reception was mixed, with reviewers panning the sequel's poorly produced CGI, writing, and production, but praising its evolution from the first film, its acting, and its suspense.

Plot
A young woman named Becky wakes up in the Cube. She enters another room; however, the room enters a state of reversed gravity, pulling her up, and it is implied that she is killed.

Later, seven captives — Kate, Simon, Jerry, Max, Julia, the blind Sasha, and the elderly Mrs. Paley — find themselves trapped in brightly lit cubes, each with a panel on each of the six sides, which are doors to other rooms. They come across Colonel Thomas Maguire, who informs the group that they must solve a code in order to escape. A wall then begins to close in on the group; they escape while Thomas intentionally stays behind and is killed. Later experiences around the cube reveal that gravity can operate in different directions in each room, while Mrs. Paley, who is revealed to be a retired theoretical mathematician, and Jerry realize that they may be in a tesseract, or a hypercube. Kate notices the numbers "60659" in every room.

The group soon realizes that they are all in some way connected to Izon, a defense contractor. Mrs. Paley opens a panel to reveal her being killed by Simon, who is decapitated soon after by crystal beams. Jerry theorizes that it is a parallel universe, while Max and Julia think it is an optical illusion. Later, while the group is sleeping, Simon explains to Jerry that he is a private investigator and is looking for Becky, a missing Izon worker. Meanwhile, Sasha hears a noise and awakens everyone. The group finds a floating square in the middle of the room, which grows into shifting variations of a tesseract, before expanding into a lethal and rapidly spinning frame. The group flees into another room, but Jerry is injured and eventually shredded by the tesseract, which grows rapidly. Kate remains to save Sasha, who is still trapped in the room, narrowly avoiding death as they group in one of the corners of the room where the tesseract cannot reach, as the tesseract conforms back to a cube and disappears. Sasha and Kate are separated from the group, as a result.

Simon starts to suspect that Mrs. Paley is an undercover spy, so he gags her and ties her up, but crystal beams start protruding from the walls. Simon tries to save Mrs. Paley, but Paley refuses to let him go, so he stabs her with his knife. Max and Julia, disturbed that Simon killed Mrs. Paley, leave and abandon him. They then begin to develop romantic feelings for each other and have sex but, unbeknownst to them, they are in a room that is zero-gravity and time dilated. They age rapidly and eventually die. Kate finds the corpses floating in the air, still in mid-coitus. Simon, alone and hungry, goes insane. He encounters a parallel Jerry and the missing Becky and kills them both.

Meanwhile, Kate finds grisly alternate realities of her death in other rooms and is horrified. Sasha tells Kate that time and space are distorted where they are, that the tesseract will implode and reality is collapsing. She reveals that she is Alex Trusk, a computer hacker who is responsible for the creation of the tesseract. She also reveals that when she discovered that Izon was putting people inside the tesseract, she tried to stop their operation, but was pursued so she "fled into the only place they wouldn't follow": the tesseract. Kate, however, still believes that there is a way out. Kate then finds Simon and stabs him in the eye after he grabs her in another room, as Simon appears behind Alex, aged and blind in one eye, proving Alex's space-time theory. Alex claims that they "are all dead", which causes Simon to snap her neck, believing that if they are all dead that it would not really matter if he kills her now.

Kate finds that the tesseract is shrinking, and she stabs Simon in the leg with his knife and punches him in his throat, killing him. She looks at the numerous duplicates of Jerry's watch and realizes that "60659" is the time that the tesseract will implode; 6:06:59. She takes Alex's necklace, which is filled with confidential information on Izon. The hypercube starts to wear away, and Kate opens a panel in the bottom, revealing a black void. At 6:06:59, she jumps in just as the Hypercube implodes.

Kate wakes up in the hands of Izon authorities in an unknown factory. She gives them the necklace, but, because of their confidentiality, she is shot in the head by one of the Izon operatives. An Izon authority reports that "Phase 2 is terminated" as the operatives leave the facility.

Cast
 Kari Matchett as Kate Filmore, who is a psychotherapist. She is portrayed as the most empathetic character in the group.
 Geraint Wyn Davies as Simon Grady, a private detective hired to locate a young woman named Becky Young who is missing.
 Grace Lynn Kung as Alexandra "Sasha" Trusk, a blind teenager and a professional computer hacker.
 Neil Crone as Jerry Whitehall, an engineer who worked on the hypercube's touch panels for the doors. He is shown to have an understanding of Quantum physics.
 Matthew Ferguson as Max Riesler, a computer hacker and game developer.
 Lindsey Connell as Julia Sewell, an LA defense lawyer representing Izon.
 Greer Kent as Becky Young, a missing young Izon worker whose parents hired Simon Grady to find her.
 Bruce Gray as Colonel Thomas H. Maguire, a man who is intimately linked with at least the first Cube.
 Barbara Gordon as Mrs. Paley, a retired theoretical mathematician who worked for Izon.
 Andrew Scorer as Dr. Phil Rosenzweig, a Nobel Prize nominee, former colleague of Mrs. Paley, and former employee of Izon.
 Paul Robbins as Tracton
 Philip Akin as The General

Alternate ending
The longer alternate ending included in the special features on the DVD reveals the "owners" to be the government; in the shorter version it is unclear who they are, but it is assumed they are Izon. Kate is executed in both versions, but she is praised for being the first operative to make it out alive. In the alternate ending it is revealed to Kate that she was in the Hypercube for just six minutes and fifty-nine seconds. It was an experiment used for quantum teleportation.

Production
The original screenplay written by Sean Hood, which was subsequently rewritten by producer Ernie Barbarash, had a substantially different plot, theme, and characters, as well as a set of over 70 production illustrations, which visualized quite different traps, environments, and four-dimensional concepts.

ReleaseHypercube premiered at the München Fantasy Filmfest on 29 July 2002 and was later released on DVD on 15 April 2003.

ReceptionCube 2: Hypercube holds a rating of 45% on Rotten Tomatoes. Reviews are mixed, with Sci-Fi Movie Page and Film Threat giving positive ratings for the movie,Cube 2: Hypercube Film Threat and sites such as JoBlo.com and DVD Verdict panning it.Cube 2: Hypercube  DVD Verdict EfilmCritic.com wrote that "while the acting isn't quite top-shelf, the cast is still serviceable enough to carry the increasing claustrophobia and confusion that sets in, and they're all quite likable in their own B movie way".

Bloody Disgusting wrote: "With pacing that's snail-like slow at times mixed with the horrid FX and lack of unique kill scenes, the film falls way short of my expectations, especially after waiting six years! But if you are a big fan of the first Cube, and expect a little less, you will enjoy Cube 2: Hypercube''".

See also
 Simulated reality
 QBism — a controversial application of Bayesian probabilities to quantum mechanics

References

External links

  official site (Sci Fi Channel). Archived from the original on June 10, 2004
 
 
 

2000s mystery films
2002 psychological thriller films
2000s science fiction horror films
2002 films
Canadian mystery films
Canadian psychological thriller films
Canadian science fiction horror films
Canadian sequel films
Cube (film series)
English-language Canadian films
Films about mathematics
Films about quantum mechanics
Films shot in Toronto
Syfy original films
Time loop films
2000s English-language films
Films with screenplays by Sean Hood
2000s American films
2000s Canadian films
2000s Japanese films